Roger Allen Christian (December 1, 1935 – November 9, 2011) was an American professional ice hockey player. Christian played for the American 1960 Winter Olympics and 1964 Winter Olympics ice hockey teams, winning a gold medal in 1960. He was inducted into the United States Hockey Hall of Fame in 1989. He was also a co-founder of Christian Brother's Hockey Sticks, along with his brother Bill Christian and brother-in-law Hal Bakke.

Early life
Born in Warroad, Minnesota, Christian began playing hockey at a young age. He would play on the roads, lakes, and outdoor rinks with his friends for up to five hours each day. Growing up he and brother, Billy, would use magazines as padding. They only had one pair of skates between the two of them and would share that pair each time they would go skating. Christian also played organized hockey at Warroad High School. He began playing at Warroad in 1950 and was the leading scorer within two years. During the 1953 season, Christian led Warroad to the State Tournament. He was later selected to the All-State Team, and was named All Region twice.

Career 
Christian international hockey for the U.S. In 1958 he led the U.S. National team in scoring, under Coach Cal Marvin and Manager Don Clark. Roger played together with Billy and a third brother, Gordon, on the 1958 United States national team. Roger played on the renowned Gold Medal winning Olympic Team, alongside his brother. He would go on to play on five U.S. National teams altogether.

After that Roger went on to play for nearly 20 years with his hometown Warroad Lakers, an amateur dynasty, where his number 7 Jersey was later retired from the Lakers roster in 1974.

Christian Brothers' 
After receiving gold medals, the two Christian brothers returned to their hometown of Warroad and established Christian Brothers Hockey Stick Manufacturing. The idea of this business was to produce a line of customized American hockey sticks. The slogan for this company was, "Hockey Sticks by Hockey Players." They refurbished an old building off of the highway Warroad and this was home to the first Christian Brother hockey stick plant.

In the early years of the company they saw success, and expanded into a new stick manufacturing plant in Warroad. They officially moved to this new plant in 1969 and operated there for many years. During the 1980 Winter Olympics, the business received additional attention. Roger's nephew Dave Christian led the U.S. team in assists and brought another gold medal to Warroad. This was not only a great accomplishment for Dave but this was beneficial for the family's company. After this, sales boomed to up to 40% more sticks. This was mainly because Dave was using a Christian Bros stick while he successfully received the gold medal.

Christian and his brother sold their company in 2002 because of changes in materials, multi-national competition, and increased licensing fees.

Personal life
Christian and his wife, Jean, had three sons. He died on November 9, 2011 in Grand Forks, North Dakota.

See also
List of Olympic medalist families

References

External links

1935 births
2011 deaths
American men's ice hockey left wingers
Huntington Hornets players
Ice hockey players from Minnesota
Ice hockey players at the 1960 Winter Olympics
Ice hockey players at the 1964 Winter Olympics
Medalists at the 1960 Winter Olympics
Olympic gold medalists for the United States in ice hockey
People from Warroad, Minnesota
Warroad Lakers players
Seattle Totems (WHL) players
United States Hockey Hall of Fame inductees